Buxton Community School is a coeducational secondary school and sixth form located in Buxton, Derbyshire, England. The school was officially opened on 19 October 1993 achieving the consolidation of four former Buxton schools on the site of the previous Buxton College. The school is a specialist sports college. The headteacher is Samantha Jones.

In 2010 an Engineering Centre was added to the site and was officially opened by The Duke of Devonshire on the 13th October. 

A 3G artificial all-weather grass pitch was a further addition in 2012 and this opened by Howard Webb MBE. 

The school is set to convert to academy status on the 31st of March 2023 under the Embark Federation Multi-Academy Trust, with no change to name, uniform or look of school. Academies have more autonomy with the National Curriculum and receive direct funding from the UK Government.

References

External links

Secondary schools in Derbyshire
Voluntary controlled schools in England
Buxton